The GMC Terrain is a crossover SUV by American manufacturer General Motors under its GMC marque. Sharing its platform with the Chevrolet Equinox, the first-generation Terrain was built on GM's Theta platform, while the second-generation model is currently built on the Delta platform. The Terrain is the smallest GMC vehicle slotted below the Acadia. It also indirectly replaced the Pontiac Torrent which was often sold in the same dealerships prior to GM dropping the Pontiac brand.



First generation (2010) 

The 2010 Terrain debuted in April 2009 at the New York International Auto Show, introduced as a replacement for the Pontiac Torrent, which ended production after GM shut down the Pontiac brand in 2010. Although the preceding Pontiac Torrent had the same Theta platform, the Torrent was a rebadged version of the original Chevrolet Equinox from 2005 to 2009, while GM decided to differ the look of the Chevrolet Equinox with its 2010 Terrain and still use the Theta platform. Early 2010 models have the GM Mark of Excellence logo applied on the sides of the vehicle.

For the 2013 model year, the GMC Terrain introduced the Denali trim which consists of more chrome trim and slightly improved interior quality, the 3.6L SIDI V6 that is shared with the 2012 Cadillac SRX in place of the optional 3.0L SIDI V6, and firmer front struts. The Denali also offers cross-traffic detection, blind-spot warning and a power passenger seat as options.

2016 refresh
For 2016, the GMC Terrain received a facelift as part of its first mid-cycle refresh along with the Equinox. The refresh consisted of new front and rear fascias, new grille, a power dome hood, LED daytime running lights, new wheels, a new gear selector, a second storage shelf under the dashboard, as well as deletion of the door lock buttons from the dashboard.

In 2016, GMC introduced the Terrain Nightfall edition, which replaces chrome with gloss-black finish on the grille surround, the front and rear fascia accents, the license-plate surround, mirror caps, and roof rack, as well as charcoal grille inserts and darkened headlights pulled from the Terrain Denali. The Terrain Nightfall comes with revised rims with machined faces and black spokes. The Terrain Nightfall trim is available on the SLE-2 and SLT trim levels and is available only in Onyx Black, Summit White, Graphite Gray, and Crimson Red.

Engines
The first generation Terrain is powered by a choice of two engines, a 2.4-liter 4-cylinder and a V6 engine that was upgraded from 3.0 liters of displacement to 3.6 liters in 2013:

Trims 
The terrain, for 2014 came in SLE, SLE-1, SLE-2, SLT, SLT-1, SLT-2 and Denali. The base SLE started at $27,199. while the range topping Denali came in at $37,998.

Natural gas version

In 2013, Nat G CNG Solutions in Houston, TX and AGA Systems in Salt Lake City, UT began offering a Compressed Natural Gas (CNG) version of the Terrain and the Chevy Equinox using the 2.4L Direct Injection engine. The natural gas version is a "bi-fuel" CNG vehicle, meaning it runs on either gasoline or natural gas, giving it extended range. The Terrain/Equinox were the first direct injection natural gas vehicles ever approved by the US EPA.

The CNG version was available for newly purchased Terrains through select dealers or as a retrofit on 2013 and 2014 models. Nat G CNG Solutions offered the vehicle in two options: a two-seater cargo version and a five-seat passenger version. The cargo version has an  combined gasoline / natural gas (9.2 gge of CNG) while the passenger version has a  combined highway range (6.8 gge of CNG).

The companies claimed that the natural gas version had tested at the EPA lab at  highway on natural gas and had achieved a Bin 3 emissions equivalent to the Toyota Prius.

Silver Eagle Distributors, L.P., the nation's largest distributor of Anheuser-Busch products, was the launch customer for the natural gas version with an initial order of up to 100 of the natural gas versions.

Recall
In March 2022, General Motors recalled over 740,000 GMC Terrain models made from 2010 to 2017 for headlights being too bright. In October 2022, General Motors issued a fix for the recall by thoroughly cleaning the headlights and adding a tape on the headlight.

Second generation (2018)

On January 8, 2017, the second generation GMC Terrain was unveiled at the 2017 North American International Auto Show as a 2018 model. The second generation went on sale in Summer 2017 and will be available in three engine choices, and standard features such as a 7-inch touchscreen and LED daytime running headlights and taillights. There is also a more luxurious variant called the GMC Terrain Denali.

2022 refresh
In February 2020, General Motors unveiled a refreshed version of the GMC Terrain; it was initially planned to go on sale in mid-2020 as 2021 model year vehicle but General Motors cancelled the GMC Terrain facelift in March 2020, due to production issues and declining demand to launch redesigned and facelifted vehicle models in 2020 as 2021 MY vehicles, as a result of the 2020 economic recession. General Motors confirmed that the GMC Terrain refresh will instead go on sale in Summer 2021 as 2022 model year vehicle along with refreshed versions of the Chevy Equinox, Chevy Traverse, and Buick Enclave.

Safety

2021
The 2021 Terrain was tested by the IIHS:

2022
The 2022 Terrain was tested by the IIHS:

Sales

References

External links

 

Terrain
Front-wheel-drive vehicles
All-wheel-drive vehicles
Compact sport utility vehicles
Crossover sport utility vehicles
2010s cars
Cars introduced in 2009